Gueorgui Linev known professionally as Kan Wakan, is a Bulgarian-born, Los Angeles and UK-based electronic music producer, composer, songwriter and multi-instrumentalist. Linev has released two studio albums under the name Kan Wakan (Moving On and Phantasmagoria Vol. 1). He is currently signed to the Bristol-based label 3tone Records. He has done collaborations with Moses Sumney, Thundercat, and toured with Lianne La Havas, and Arctic Monkeys, just to name a few. Well-known for his cinematic approach, Linev wrote the music for Brian Klemesrud's 2016 crime thriller Dead Draw.

Musical style 
Gueorgui Linev incorporates both electronic and acoustic instruments into his compositions, often featuring instrumental solos such as his use of harmonica on "Molasses." With Kan Wakan, Linev often uses live orchestras in compliment to Analog Synthesizer, Electric Guitar and Bass, and various other instruments.

His music is described as "touching the borders of trip-hop, acoustic balladry, and psychedelia" according to The Fader. LA Weekly'''s Jeff Weiss described his music as "Striking a smooth, sinister balance between crepuscular trip-hop and experimental minimalism, Kan Wakan’s debut artfully recalls Air and Portishead, Mazzy Star and The Cinematic Orchestra."

 Career 

 Kan Wakan 
Kan Wakan formed in 2010 and began putting out songs two years later. In 2013, Kan Wakan released its debut EP, produced by Linev and engineered by Grammy Award-winning engineer Darrell Thorp. Those entrancing early tracks quickly earned him airplay on Los Angeles' KCRW radio station, a publisher, management and a contract with Universal's sub-publisher Verve Music Group. The EP featured orchestra performances via the Metamorphosis Chamber Orchestra led by Linev's uncle, Bulgarian Virtuosi Chamber Orchestra conductor Stefan Linev. In 2014, Kan Wakan returned with his debut full-length album, Moving On. Upon release, 'Moving On' peaked at #37 on the Billboard Heatseekers Albums chart. Yahoo! Music listed Kan Wakan as one of the "11 Best New Artists of 2014" and the success of 'Moving On' lead to Gueorgui Linev being named one of "The 10 Best Young L.A. Songwriters" by LA Weekly in 2014.

In August 2016, Kan Wakan released 'Molasses,' which was named "Today's Top Tune" by Los Angeles based radio station KCRW, and premiered in Nylon Magazine. Followed by positive reviews from notable music blogs, including Indie Shuffle, the track hit #2 on Hype Machine. Following the successful momentum of 'Molasses,' Phantasmagoria's second single 'I Would' reached #2 on Hype Machine after Clash Magazine premiered the track, calling it "Absorbing" and was later placed in Indie Shuffle's "Best of October" Playlist.

 Phantasmagoria Vol. 1 
In 2018, Kan Wakan released his second studio album Phantasmagoria Vol. 1. His song Molasses'' (ft. Elle Olsun) was used on season 1 of the American drama Queen Sugar.

Discography

References

External links
 Kan Wakan

Year of birth missing (living people)
Living people
Electro musicians
Trip hop musicians
Experimental musicians
Psychedelic musicians